Bismarck Municipal Airport  is in Burleigh County, North Dakota, United States, three miles southeast of the City of Bismarck, North Dakota, which owns it. The National Plan of Integrated Airport Systems for 2011–2015 categorized it as a primary commercial service airport.

History

The original terminal, a single-story Modernist building, was designed in 1963 by Ritterbush Brothers, a local architectural firm. A two-story addition was constructed in 1982. The original building was demolished in 2003 to make way for the present building, and the addition was demolished in summer of 2005, after the completion of the new $15 million terminal. It was designed by Tvenge Associates, another Bismarck firm, and opened in May 2005. A parking lot is just south of the new terminal.

Bismarck Airport had its 7th consecutive year of record passenger boardings in 2016, with 271,020 passengers boarding commercial airline flights at the airport. Airport Director Greg Haug "...was pleased to see the year-end numbers come in and attributes these record boardings to Bismarck’s strong economy."

Facilities
Bismarck Municipal Airport covers 2,425 acres (981 ha) at an elevation of 1,661 feet (506 m). It has two runways, both asphalt: 13/31 is 8,794 by 150 feet (2,680 x 46 m) and 3/21 is 6,600 by 100 feet (2,012 x 30 m).

In the year ending December 31, 2020, the airport had 28,004 aircraft operations, average 77 per day. 93 aircraft were then based at the airport: 49 single-engine aircraft, 16 multi-engine aircraft, 15 military aircraft, 11 jet aircraft, and 2 helicopters.

Airlines and destinations

Passenger

Allegiant Air uses Airbus A319-111s and Airbus A320-214s to Las Vegas, Phoenix, and Orlando. American Eagle uses Bombradier CRJ 700s to Dallas. Delta Air Lines uses Airbus A320-212s to Minneapolis. Delta Connection uses Embrear E175s operated by SkyWest Airlines to Minneapolis. United Express uses Bombardier CRJ200s operated by SkyWest Airlines to Denver.

Cargo

Statistics

Top destinations from BIS

Annual traffic

Accidents at or near BIS
On April 7, 1998, a Corporate Air Cessna 208B Super Cargomaster impacted terrain 1.6 miles SE of Bismarck Municipal Airport due to the pilot's failure to maintain airspeed during the approach, icing conditions and low level experience with the aircraft type. The sole occupant, the pilot, was killed.

See also
 North Dakota World War II Army Airfields

References

External links

 
 Aerial image as of September 1997 from USGS The National Map
 
 

Airports in North Dakota
Bismarck–Mandan
Buildings and structures in Bismarck, North Dakota
Transportation in Burleigh County, North Dakota
Airfields of the United States Army Air Forces in North Dakota
Airfields of the United States Army Air Forces Air Transport Command in North America